The M4 was a French submarine-launched ballistic missile (SLBM) deployed on the nuclear s (except the Redoutable herself, which was not refitted).

They entered service on May 1, 1985. They were the first French MIRV-capable nuclear missiles, with six 150 kilotonne warheads.

They were replaced by the improved M45 SLBM missile which was in service aboard the
.

Operators

French Navy

References

Submarine-launched ballistic missiles of France
Nuclear weapons of France
1985 establishments in France
Military equipment introduced in the 1980s